Mik Scarlet (born 1965) is a broadcaster, journalist, actor and musician, as well as an expert in the field of access and inclusion for disabled people. He has been voted one of the most influential disabled people in the UK, and was one of the first television presenters in the world with a physical disability.

Early life 
Scarlet was born in Luton, Bedfordshire. He is a wheelchair user due to the consequences of cancer during infancy.

Career 
As one of the first generation of disabled television presenters, Scarlet is best known for presenting the 1992 Emmy Award winning and BAFTA nominated children's television programme "Beat That" on Channel Four. He won a UNICEF award for work with disabled children.

He has also played several cameo roles in shows such as Brookside and The Bill, and was a presenter for BBC2's "From the Edge". He has appeared in numerous television programmes including 2point4 Children.

Scarlet is a regular correspondent for The Huffington Post. He wrote an article for The Independent in 2000 about social rights and was quoted in The Independent about the 2016 Summer Paralympics. In 2012, he wrote an article for Time Out about accessibility in London. That year, he performed in the Paralympic Opening Ceremony and presented coverage of the wheelchair rugby for The Paralympic Games.

Scarlet has appeared on various news and current affairs programmes, such as The Wright Stuff, Good Morning Britain, This Morning and Sky News, both as a commentator and reporter. Scarlet also is an occasional reporter for Channel Five News.

He is an ambassador for Parallel London, the inclusive, disability-led push/run event.

In 2018, Scarlet was named on The Shaw Trust Disability Power 100 list, an annual publication of the 100 most influential disabled people in the UK.

References

External links 
 Mik Scarlet website
 

Living people
People from Luton
1965 births
English people with disabilities
British television presenters
Television presenters with disabilities